Thomas Jarvis (1623–1694) was the Deputy Governor of the Carolina Province from 1691 to 1694.

Biography 
Thomas Jarvis was born in Northampton, Virginia in 1623 to Thomas Jarvis and Elizabeth Bacon. He started his political career in 1672 as a member of the executive council under Governor Peter Carteret and continued to play an active role in colonial politics for two decades. From 1683–1689, Jarvis was the acting chief executive during the tenures of governors Seth Sothel and John Gibbs. In 1691 he was appointed Deputy Governor of North and South Carolina where he served under Governor Philip Ludwell. With this appointment, Thomas became the first deputy governor of the entire colony, including the area north-east of Cape Fear.

Very little is known about his private life. Jarvis married Dorcas Foster and had two sons, Thomas III and Foster, along with one daughter, Dorcas. He purchased a piece of land located between the Perquimans River and Carolina Sound (at that time known as the Albemarle county). This land was purchased in conjunction with a Native American tribe. Jarvis also owned an estate on Whites Island, where he made his primary residence. Sometime before his appointment to deputy governor in 1691, Jarvis was a ship captain. In addition, Jarvis owned at least seven slaves (three were African Americans, two were Native Americans, and two were of biracial descent). He died in White's Island, Currituck, NC in 1694.

References

Further reading 

1694 deaths
17th-century American people
Deputy governors of North Carolina (1691–1712)
1623 births